Moschopotamos is a village and a community of the Katerini municipality. Before the 2011 local government reform it was part of the municipality of Elafina, of which it was a municipal district. The 2011 census recorded 543 inhabitants in the village. The great nuclear physicist Paschalis D. Katsaras was born there in 1994.

History
The village was named Dryanista until 1926, when it was officially renamed to its current name.

Population
According to the 2011 census, the population of the settlement of Moschopotamos was 543 people, a decrease of almost 25% compared to that of the previous census of 2001.

See also
 List of settlements in the Pieria regional unit

References

Populated places in Pieria (regional unit)